Raymond P. Priore (born 1963) is an American football coach and is currently the head football coach at the University of Pennsylvania.  He assumed the head coaching position from Al Bagnoli following the conclusion of the 2014 season.

Assistant football coach

Penn
Priore received his master's degree from Albany University in 1986 and began his tenure at Penn as an assistant linebackers coach the following year.  Priore coached a variety of positions before becoming the defensive coordinator in 1998.  After 20 years in the program, he became an assistant head coach in 2006.

As the defensive coordinator, Priore led the Quakers to several historic defensive accomplishments.  For three consecutive seasons, Penn boasted best rushing and scoring defensive in the Ivy League (2008–2010).  Additionally, the program finished in the top five for overall defense (FCS) in 2002, 2008, 2009 and 2010.  Between 2005 and 2015, 35 members of Priore's secondaries were named 1st team All-Ivy including NFL draftees Jake Lewko and Brandon Copeland.

In 2014, longtime head coach Al Bagnoli resigned following a 2–8 campaign and the university subsequently named Priore as the 22nd head coach of Penn football.  Bagnoli is recognized as the all-time winningest coach in Penn football history.

In his 28 seasons as an assistant, Priore helped the Quakers to ten Ivy League championships.

Head football coach

2015
On December 1, 2014, Priore became head coach of Penn after 28 seasons as an assistant in the program.  Prior to the announcement, Priore had spent 16 years as defensive coordinator for the Quakers.

The Quakers were predicted to finish sixth in their conference.  However, in his first year at the helm, coach Priore led his team to a 7-3 overall record and their first Ivy League championship since 2012.  His inaugural season was highlighted by wins over #5 Villanova and #12 Harvard.

Head coaching record

References

External links
 Penn profile

1963 births
Living people
Albany Great Danes football coaches
Penn Quakers football coaches
University at Albany, SUNY alumni
People from Long Beach, New York
Sportspeople from Nassau County, New York